Saving Mr. Wu,, previously known as The Strongest Competitor, is a 2015 Chinese action crime thriller film directed by Ding Sheng and starring Andy Lau, Liu Ye, Wu Ruofu and Wang Qianyuan. The film was based on a true abduction case where cast member Wu Ruofu was the victim.

Plot
Ruthless criminal Zhang Hua (Wang Qianyuan) and his gang impersonate as police officers to abduct wealthy businessmen. Setting a trap outside a Beijing karaoke club, they hit the jackpot with Hong Kong film star Mr Wu (Andy Lau), forcing him into their car on the pretext of being investigated for a hit-and-run.

In the Beijing suburbs, Wu is bound, gagged and beaten into compliance by Zhang's men. Then Wu is made to witness the execution of Xiao Dou (Cai Lu), Zhang's last abducted victim, who failed to have his ransom paid within 24 hours. Wu steps in to save him, promising to pay both men's ransoms.

To ensure he is not delivered as a corpse, Wu makes a call to his old friend Mr. Su (Lam Suet) and asks him to ensure that he is alive before delivering RMB3 million. Wu's calm, intelligence and dignity in the face of death earns Zhang's respect. Zhang leaves for the city in morning, instructing his gang to kill both victims at 9pm if they do not hear from him.

Meanwhile, police vice captain Xing Feng (Liu Ye) and captain Cao Gang (Wu Ruofu) have formed an anti-kidnap task force. After a series of tip-offs, they detain Zhang when he leaves the apartment of his mistress, Chenchen (Vivien Li). But Zhang refuses to give up Wu's location without a pardon. As 9pm approaches, the police stage a final desperate rescue attempt based on an unreliable tip as the kidnapping gang, fearing they'll be Zhang's next victims, decides to kill the hostages before the deadline. The police break into the house as the gang is strangling the hostages, narrowly saving both Wu and Dou.

Cast
Andy Lau as Mr. Wu (吾先生), a Hong Kong film star and the abducted victim
Liu Ye as Xing Feng (邢峰), a police vice-captain
Wu Ruofu as Cao Gang (曹剛), a police captain
Wang Qianyuan as Zhang Hua (張華), leader of the abductors
Lam Suet as Mr. Su (蘇先生), a friend of Mr. Wu
Zhao Xiaoyue as Zhang Yi (張總), a police commander
Vivien Li as Chenchen (陳晨), Zhang Hua's girlfriend
Cai Lu as Xiao Dou (小竇), another victim abducted by Zhang Hua
Yu Ailei as Cang (倉哥), an abductor
 Ma Sichun (cameo)

Production
Production of Saving Mr. Wu was kept at a low profile and was first revealed when actor Liu Ye wrote in his Sina Weibo account that he was working on a film with Andy Lau. In early January 2015, location shots were being filmed in Sanlitun, Beijing. On 26 January, location shoots were done at Pinggu District where Lau was spotted by reporters and fans. On 9 February, it was announced that production of the film had officially wrapped up.

Release
On 8 February 2015, the teaser poster of the film was unveiled at the 65th Berlin International Film Festival. In May 2015, another teaser poster was unveiled 68th Cannes Film Festival displaying an international release date of October 2015.

Box office
As of 27 October 2015, the film has grossed a total of US$31,212,702 worldwide, combining its box office gross from China, Hong Kong, Malaysia, North America and Singapore.

Awards and nominations

References

External links
 
 
 

2015 action thriller films
2015 crime thriller films
2010s Mandarin-language films
Chinese action thriller films
Chinese crime thriller films
Films directed by Ding Sheng
Films about actors
Films about kidnapping
Thriller films based on actual events
Films set in Beijing
Films shot in Beijing
2015 films
Chinese nonlinear narrative films